Hermann Konstantin Albert Julius von Hanneken (5 January 1890 – 22 July 1981) was a German General of the Infantry who was supreme commander of the German forces in Denmark from 29 September 1942 to January 1945.

Early career
On 19 July 1908 after training in cadet school von Hanneken joined the Königin Augusta Garde Grenadier Regiment No. 4 as a Fähnrich. A little over a year later, on 19 August 1909, he was promoted to Leutnant.
On 1 October 1913 until the start of the great war, he was apart of the Oldenburg Infantry Regiment No. 91.

World War I
Soon after the start of the Great War von Hanneken became the Adjutant of the III. Battalion of the 79th Reserve-Infantry-Regiment until 3 January 1915. von Hanneken was then transferred to the 260th Reserve-Infantry-Regiment as the Regiments-Adjutant, being promoted on 24 July 1915 to Oberleutnant.  From 10 July 1916 he served as leader of the regiments Machine Gun-Company. After 16 November 1916 he was made a temporary adjutant of the 37th Infantry-Division until 11 December 1916 in which he was transferred to the staff of the 78th-Reserve-Division. On 17 April 1917 von Hanneken into the Department "Foreign Armies" with the Chief of the General Staff of the Field Army. It was while he was during this time, on 15 July 1918, that he was promoted to Hauptmann. On 15 August 1918 von Hanneken was transferred into the Operations-Department of the Supreme Army Command, were he would stay until 24 September 1918. After this point, he was made a General-Staff-Officer of the 88th Infantry-Division.

Interbellum
After the war, in 1918, von Hanneken was among the officers who joined the German Reichswehr. Then he took a job in Reichswehr Ministry where he was the next year. Then from 1924 to 1927 he was transferred to Reichwaffenamt (materiel command). From 1927 he led troops as a company commander, and it continued until in 1930 when he was promoted to Major. Three years later he was again promoted to Oberstleutnant. From 1935 he had command of a regiment and was thus promoted to Oberst.

A year later, in 1936, he was transferred to Heereswaffenamt (materiel command), where he became Chief of Staff. On 3 July 1937, he became responsible for the purchase of iron and steel. On 1 September 1939 he was appointed Head of Section II (Industrial) in the ministry of commercial. In 1940 he received the position as vice Secretary of State. That same year he was promoted to Generalleutnant and in 1941 he was General der Infanterie.

World War II
After the outbreak of World War II a supply crisis in the iron and steel division caused him problems, and only  could save him. Delivery time had increased dramatically because over a period of two years von Hanneken had approved supplies that exceeded the amount of iron and steel that could be delivered. Hans Kehrl said nothing about this in its public records, but his caseworker  did in return. Kehrl wrote in his memoirs that von Hanneken was not sufficiently decisive and was afraid of conflict.

von Hanneken was also responsible for addressing the issues of coal to the steel industry. So on 6 June 1941 he raised at the 11th meeting in  the problem that the demand for coal in the last four years had risen faster than supply. The European countries which were dependent on German coal only got 60% of the claimed amounts. From April 1941 domestic coal consumers had to accept a reduction of supplies of around 10%. This led to many closures of companies or reduction of operations. Domestic energy suppliers had to accept a reduction in coal consumption of 20%.

In March / April 1942 von Hanneken was denied responsibility for the distribution of iron and steel, which were transferred to the so-called central planning. As a result of further changes in the tasks of Section II largely transferred to other bodies so Hanneken went on holiday in August 1942 and left Section II in October.

On 12 October 1942 he took over the duties of Erich Lüdke as commander of the German forces in Denmark. He was responsible for defending the invasion and took a tougher line against the Danish resistance movement, which brought him into conflict with Werner Best.

On 29 August 1943 von Hanneken imposed martial law in Denmark. It was the result of growing unrest, strikes and sabotage in the months before. Simultaneously, the Danish army and navy were dissolved and their personnel interned. von Hanneken was made aware of but was not otherwise involved in the action against the Danish Jews in early October 1943 led by Günther Pancke. On 19 September 1944 he backtracked over the dissolution of the Danish police.

In January 1945 he was relieved of his command and replaced by Georg Lindemann. He was accused of corruption, and subsequently sentenced by the German national court-martial to eight years imprisonment. He was, however, pardoned by Adolf Hitler, who thought that they could not afford the luxury of letting von Hanneken sit in jail. Instead, von Hanneken was demoted to Major and sent to the front. At the end of the war he became an American prisoner. From there, he was extradited to Denmark and held awaiting trial.

At the Court he was acquitted on 9 May 1949. He was expelled from Denmark and lived thereafter a quite low-profile lifestyle until his death in 1981.

Decorations and awards
 Knight's Cross of War Merit Cross with Swords (previously, 1st and 2nd class with Swords) (21 December 1944)
 Knight of Honour of the Order of Saint John (Bailiwick of Brandenburg)
 German Cross in Gold (2 December 1944)
 Iron Cross of 1914, 1st and 2nd Class
 Honour Cross of the World War 1914/1918
 Bavarian Military Merit Order 4th Class with Swords
 Hamburg Hanseatic Cross
 Austrian Military Merit Cross 3rd Class with War Decoration
 Knight's Cross of Bulgarian Military Merit Order
 Ottoman War Medal (Turkish: Harp Madalyası, better known as the "Gallipoli Star" or "Iron Crescent")
 Clasp to the Iron Cross (2nd Class & 1st Class)
 War Merit Cross, 1st and 2nd Class (Brunswick)
 Friedrich August Cross, 1st and 2nd Class
 Wound Badge of 1918 in Black
 Wehrmacht Long Service Award, 4th with 1st class

Footnotes

References
 
 

1890 births
1981 deaths
People from Gotha (town)
People from Saxe-Coburg and Gotha
Recipients of the Knights Cross of the War Merit Cross
Recipients of the Gold German Cross
Recipients of the clasp to the Iron Cross, 1st class
Knights of the Order of Military Merit (Bulgaria)
German Army personnel of World War I
People deported from Denmark
People extradited to Denmark
German Army generals of World War II
Generals of Infantry (Wehrmacht)
Military personnel from Thuringia